Moneca Stori (born January 17, 1970) is a Canadian former voice actress known mostly for her role as the original voice of Kagome Higurashi in the English version of Inuyasha, as well as her  lead role of Laura Haruna from the long running Hamtaro series. She began her career performing for thousands of children in theater for young audience productions and was also seen in the Vancouver TheatreSports' Jessie Award-winning production of Free Willy Shakespeare. Stori is currently retired as an actress.

Filmography 
 Ayakashi: Samurai Horror Tales – Nadeshiko (Tenshu Monogatari segment), additional voices
 Dragonball Z (Ocean Group Dub) – Videl
 Elemental Gelade – Arc Aile Rep (Ep. 12)
 Geronimo Stilton – Pandora Woz
 Gundam Wing – Sally Po (Eps. 3, 8, 12), Catherine Bloom, additional voices (Eps. 1–13)
 Hamtaro – Laura Haruna
 Inuyasha – Kagome Higurashi, additional voices
 Inuyasha: Feudal Combat – Kagome Higurashi
 Inuyasha: The Secret of the Cursed Mask – Kagome Higurashi
 Jin-Roh: The Wolf Brigade – Kei Amemiya
 Junkers Come Here – Yoko Inoue
 Maison Ikkoku – Additional voices (Eps. 37–96)
 Mary-Kate and Ashley in Action! – Additional voices
 Master Keaton – Additional voices
 Megaman NT Warrior Axess (TV) – Silk
 Mobile Suit Gundam: Encounters in Space – Noelle Anderson
 Monster Rancher – Michelle (Ep. 60)
 Ranma ½ – Princess Ori, additional voices (Eps. 137–161)
 Sabrina: Friends Forever – Hilda Spellman
 Sabrina's Secret Life – Hilda/Zelda Spellman
 X-Men: Evolution – Amanda Sefton (Eps. 26-39)

References

Further reading

External links 

Canadian video game actresses
Canadian voice actresses
Living people
Actresses from Vancouver
1970 births
20th-century Canadian actresses
21st-century Canadian actresses